In enzymology, an inositol 2-dehydrogenase is an enzyme that catalyzes the chemical reaction

myo-inositol + NAD+  2,4,6/3,5-pentahydroxycyclohexanone + NADH + H+

Thus, the two substrates of this enzyme are myo-inositol and NAD+, whereas its 3 products are 2,4,6/3,5-pentahydroxycyclohexanone, NADH, and H+.

This enzyme belongs to the family of oxidoreductases, specifically those acting on the CH-OH group of donor with NAD+ or NADP+ as acceptor. The systematic name of this enzyme class is myo-inositol:NAD+ 2-oxidoreductase. Other names in common use include myo-inositol 2-dehydrogenase, myo-inositol:NAD+ oxidoreductase, inositol dehydrogenase, and myo-inositol dehydrogenase. This enzyme participates in inositol metabolism and inositol phosphate metabolism.

References

 
 
 

EC 1.1.1
NADH-dependent enzymes
Enzymes of unknown structure